St. Rose Dominican Hospital – Rose de Lima Campus is a  10-bed non-profit hospital owned and operated by Dignity Health in Henderson, Nevada. It provides emergency care, diagnostic imaging, and limited general medicine and surgery in-patient care services.

History

The first of the three St. Rose Dominican hospitals, the Rose de Lima Campus was established in 1947 when the Adrian Dominican Sisters of Adrian, Michigan, purchased Basic Magnesium Hospital from the U.S. federal government for one dollar a year for a period of 25 years. A $25 million, 4-story expansion was completed in 1991. Rose de Lima Campus completed a two-year transition to a small hospital in 2019. 

St. Rose Dominican Hospital – Rose de Lima Campus was the first hospital in Southern Nevada to be fully accredited by Joint Commission on Accreditation of Hospitals.

Services

 Acute Rehabilitation Unit
 Bariatric Weight Loss Surgery Program
 Chapel and Chaplains
 Community Outreach Programs
 Emergency Department
 Get Well Network
 Home Health and Hospice services
 Inpatient Rehabilitation Facility
 Intensive Care Unit
 Inpatient laboratory services
 In- and out-patient surgical and rehabilitative services
 Joint Replacement Center
 Palliative Care
 PillCam Capsule Endoscopy
 Radiology services, including digital mammography
 Respiratory Therapy
 Wound Healing & Hyperbaric Medicine Center

See also
 St. Rose Dominican Hospital – San Martín Campus
 St. Rose Dominican Hospital – Siena Campus

References

External links
 

1947 establishments in Nevada
Buildings and structures in Henderson, Nevada
Dignity Health
Hospital buildings completed in 1947
Catholic hospitals in North America
Hospitals established in 1947
Hospitals in the Las Vegas Valley